is a Japanese female author from Ibaraki Prefecture. She is best known for her light novel The Story of Saiunkoku series.

Works

Light novels
Written by Sai Yukino and illustrated by Kairi Yura, the light novel series The Story of Saiunkoku has been serialized in The Beans since 2003. The individual chapters are collected and published in full novel volumes by Kadokawa Shoten with the first volume released in Japan on October 31, 2003. As of April 2010, 16 volumes have been released for the series.

Side stories
Sai Yukino has written a series of short side stories for The Story of Saiunkoku which are published in collected volumes by Kadokawa Shoten. The first volume was released in April 2005; as of May 2009, four volumes have been released.

See also
 The Story of Saiunkoku

References

Light novelists
Japanese writers
Living people
Year of birth missing (living people)